Parowa may refer to the following places in Poland:
Parowa, Lower Silesian Voivodeship (south-west Poland)
Parowa, Pomeranian Voivodeship (north Poland)
Parowa, Nidzica County in Warmian-Masurian Voivodeship (north Poland)
Parowa, Węgorzewo County in Warmian-Masurian Voivodeship (north Poland)
Parowa (village) in Nalbari